Rowe is an unincorporated community in Buchanan County, Virginia, United States. Rowe is located on State Route 624 6 miles south of Oakwood. Rowe has a post office with ZIP code 24646, which opened on January 25, 1939.

It was likely named for John S. Rowe, a pioneer settler.

References

Unincorporated communities in Buchanan County, Virginia
Unincorporated communities in Virginia